Egbo is a surname. Notable people with the surname include:

David Egbo (born 1998), Nigerian footballer 
Mandela Egbo (born 1997), British footballer
Ndubuisi Egbo (born 1973), Nigerian football manager and former footballer
Queen Egbo (born 2000), American basketball player

See also
Egbo Osita (born 1988), Nigerian football defender and midfielder